Smerch (Russian word for whirlwind) might refer to:

 BM-30 Smerch, a modern multiple rocket launcher system
 Smerch (radar), fighter radar on the Mikoyan-Gurevich MiG-25
 Whirlwind (1988 film), 1988 action film produced in the Soviet Union
 Russian monitor Smerch, launched 1863

Smerch may also refer to:
 a portmanteau nickname given to the British actor Stephen Merchant